Bonaventure (also known as Elizabeth Bonaventure) was a 47-gun galleon purchased by the Royal Navy in 1567.  She was the third vessel to bear the name.  She was commanded by Sir Francis Drake during his 1587 attack on Cadiz, and a year later was part of the fleet to face the Spanish Armada.

Service history
The ship took part in the Great Expedition by privateer Francis Drake, which raided the Spanish New World in 1585 and 1586. As part of the Expedition, Bonaventure was present for Drake's assaults on Santo Domingo, Cartagena de Indias and San Augustin.

Attack on Cadiz (1587)

After the execution in February 1587 of Mary, Queen of Scots, Philip II of Spain decided that it was time to invade England, and started to prepare his armada.  Bonaventure, under the command of Francis Drake was sent as flagship of the English fleet to try to prevent and/or delay the armada.  The fleet numbered roughly twenty-six vessels, which included three more of the Queen's ships in addition to Bonaventure; Golden Lion, Dreadnought and Rainbow, three tall ships of the Levant Company, seven men-of-war of 150–200 tons and eleven or twelve smaller vessels. His orders from the Queen were:

"to prevent the joining together of the King of Spain's fleet out of their different ports. To keep victuals from them. To follow them in case they should come out towards England or Ireland. To cut off as many of them as he could, and prevent their landing. To set upon the West Indian ships as they came or went."

She immediately changed her mind and issued less aggressive orders, however Drake had set sail from England on 12 April 1587 before receiving these orders, and thus acted upon the first.  Having heard that the ships were gathering in the harbour at Cádiz, Drake decided to hunt them there.  On his arrival seventeen days later, they discovered the inner and outer harbours full of the enemy vessels. After a short discussion with his vice-admiral, Captain William Borough, Drake decided against waiting until the following morning, and led his fleet in.  A squadron of galleys commanded by Don Pedro de Acuña were in a state of readiness, and spread across the harbour while one of their number sailed to challenge Drake's oncoming fleet.  Before it could get close enough to hail the English, Bonaventure and possibly some of the other vessels close opened fire, sending cannonballs in the direction of the Spanish galleon.  Any one of the four Queen's vessels carried more firepower than all of Don Pedro's galleys combined, and the Spanish commander was forced to concentrate on delaying the English fleet to give the other Spanish vessels time to prepare.  In time however, the resistance faded and Drake gained control of the bay.

Over the next month, the fleet sailed up and down the Iberian coast between Lisbon and Cape St Vincent, destroying supplies being sent to Lisbon for the armada.  Included in these supplies were a large quantity of barrel staves, according to Drake's personal estimate, enough for over 25,000 tons of provisions and water.

Spanish Armada (1588)
The following year, Bonaventure, commanded by George Clifford, 3rd Earl of Cumberland, was part of the English fleet to battle the Spanish Armada.  During this battle, she carried 51.5 tons of ordnance, totalling over 8% of her maximum tonnage.  When surveyed on 25 September 1588, the only damage listed from the battle was to the sails, which were "shot full of holes".

Later Voyages
Bonaventure then set out on an early expedition that became a forerunner to the East India Company; according to Sir George C. V. Holmes, Bonaventure—operating under the auspices of the Levant Company—was the first English ship to make a successful voyage to India. Under the command of James Lancaster she left England in April 1591 with two other ships (Penelope and Marchant Royal) and then sailed around Cape Comorin and on to the Malay Peninsula. Having reached Table Bay (1 August 1591), and losing one ship off Cape Correntes on 12 September, the squadron rested and refitted at Zanzibar (February 1592), rounded Cape Comorin the following May, and reached the Malay Peninsula having arrived at Penang in June. Here they remained on the island until September of the same year and pillaged every vessel he encountered.

Bonaventure survived the journey back and subsequently returned to England in 1594. In 1626 she was apparently still in service under royal navy captain John Chudleigh (MP for Lostwithiel) in an expedition under Montagu Bertie, 2nd Earl of Lindsey who was also the son of John Chidley who was one of Walter Raleighs friends.

In Literature
This is this ship referred to in Letitia Elizabeth Landon's poem The Sailor's Bride, or The Bonaventure in Fisher's Drawing Room Scrap Book, 1839.

References

Bibliography
 
 
 
 

Ships of the Royal Navy
16th-century ships
Ships of the English navy